Soner Boz (born 12 January 1968) is a retired Turkish football striker.

While at Kocaelispor he scored in the first leg of the 1997 Turkish Cup Final against his former club Trabzonspor, which helped his team to a 2-1 aggregate win.

Honours

Club
Trabzonspor
Turkish Cup: 1991–92, 1994–95
Turkish Super Cup: 1995

Kocaelispor
Turkish Cup: 1996–97

References

1968 births
Living people
Turkish footballers
Trabzonspor footballers
Kocaelispor footballers
Siirtspor footballers
Association football forwards